The Lavochkin La-150 (also known as the Izdeliye 150 – Aircraft or Article 150, USAF/DOD designation Type 3), was designed by the Lavochkin design bureau (OKB) in response to a 1945 order to build a single-seat jet fighter using a single German turbojet. By this time both the Americans and British, as well as the Germans, had already flown jet fighters and the single Soviet jet engine under development (the Lyulka TR-1) was not yet ready for production. The design was completed quickly, but the construction of the five flying prototypes was protracted by the factory's inexperience in building metal aircraft. The aircraft made its first flight in September 1946, but proved to require extensive modifications to meet the Soviet Air Forces' requirements. These took so long to make and test that the aircraft was essentially obsolete by the time that they were completed. Even one variant with a much more powerful engine was inferior to other aircraft that the OKB had under development and all work was terminated in 1947.

Design and development
The Lavochkin OKB was ordered to design a fighter using a single Junkers Jumo 004B axial-flow turbojet in February 1945. Much like their rivals at the Mikoyan-Gurevich OKB with their MiG-9, the OKB chose a "pod-and-boom" layout for their new fighter, based on advice from the Central Aerohydrodynamic Institute (TsAGI), although their design had a shoulder-mounted wing. The wings of the all-metal aircraft had fixed leading edges and slotted flaps. The cockpit was well forward, giving the pilot good visibility, and he was protected by an armored headrest. The windscreen of the teardrop-shaped canopy was also armored. Two  Nudelman-Suranov NS-23 autocannon were mounted on the lower side of the fuselage with 75 rounds per gun. The tricycle landing gear retracted into the fuselage which gave the 150 a very narrow track. A steel heat shield protected the bottom of the rear fuselage from the engine's exhaust. Air was supplied by an intake in the aircraft nose that split around the cockpit before reaching the engine.

Construction of a full-scale mockup was completed in June 1945 by Factory No. 81, but the order for five prototypes was given to Factory No. 381 as Factory No. 81 was already fully committed to other programs. Manufacturing drawings were delivered to Factory No. 381 by the end of August, but the prototypes were delayed because the plant had no experience building metal aircraft and lacked the necessary tooling. By the end of the year, the factory had only managed to complete a single airframe for static load testing. This showed that the rear fuselage, wings and tail needed to be reinforced, and the opportunity was taken to enlarge the vertical stabilizer as well. These tests and modifications required six months of work so that the first flying prototype was not completed until July 1946. Manufacturer's testing of the first prototype began on 27 August, after ground testing had required replacing the engine twice, and the first flight was made on 11 September.

The following day, the Council of Ministers ordered that a small batch of jets from each OKB were to participate in the 7 November parade commemorating the October Revolution. Because of the tight deadline, the components for the two incomplete prototypes were turned over to Factory No. 301 at Khimki, the new headquarters for the Lavochkin OKB, for assembly by Factory No. 381. Factory No. 21 in Gorky joined the program with three more aircraft built in record time with support from Factory No. 301. Tooling was constructed in 5–10 days with the first aircraft completed in a week and a half.

Testing and evaluation
All eight aircraft were complete by 1 November and had been tested to ensure their readiness to participate in the parade. They were later given the unofficial service designation of La-13. It was considered too risky to fly the aircraft from Gorky to Moscow and their wings could not be dismounted which meant that they could not be railed to Moscow either. Special three-wheeled trailers were built and the aircraft were driven to Moscow, but the flypast was cancelled because of bad weather.

The tests conducted in preparation for the parade revealed a number of flaws in the design including poor directional stability, a cramped cockpit without heating or ventilation, poor access to the engine, inadequate fuel capacity, compounded by the lack of a fuel gauge, and poor elevator control forces. Five aircraft were modified to correct these issues before resuming the factory's testing in late 1946. The modifications were not entirely successful and the lateral stability was now too great and the elevator forces remained too weak. Engine problems, however, plagued the tests as the first prototype alone required four engine changes.

After the conclusion of the manufacturer's trials in April 1947, one aircraft was returned to the factory for extensive modifications as the 150M. The wing tips were angled downward 35° to reduce the lateral stability, the wing was redesigned to detach from the fuselage, and the aerodynamic balancing of the elevators was reduced from 24% to 20%. Fore and aft armor plates were fitted to protect the pilot and a new radio aerial mast was installed. Given that a higher-performance design, the Aircraft 156, had already been submitted for state acceptance trials, Semyon Lavochkin decided not to continue the development of the 150M.

In the meantime, the OKB had been developing two afterburning versions of the RD-10 in an effort to increase the engine's power. The more successful model was only  longer and weighed an additional  more than the original engine. Its power, however, was increased by an additional , over 30% more thrust. This engine was designated the izdeliye YuF by the bureau and was fitted into an aircraft 150 prototype in July 1947, designated as the 150F. This made the 150F the second-fastest Soviet fighter of the period, after the MiG-9 powered by two afterburning RD-21 engines. Nevertheless, Lavochkin decided not to submit the 150F for state acceptance trials as the fundamental design flaws of the airframe still had not been resolved.

Operators

Soviet Air Force

Variants
150M – One 150 prototype was modified with drooped wingtips, a wider cockpit and extra fuel.
150F – One 150 prototype was modified with an Izdeliye YuF engine, an afterburning RD-10.

Specifications (Aircraft 150)

See also

Notes

Citations

Bibliography

 Gordon, Yefim. Early Soviet Jet Fighters. Hinckley, UK: Midland Publishing, 2002. .
Gunston, Bill. The Osprey Encyclopedia of Russian Aircraft 1875–1995. London: Osprey, 1995. .

La-150
1940s Soviet fighter aircraft
Abandoned military aircraft projects of the Soviet Union
Single-engined jet aircraft
Shoulder-wing aircraft
Aircraft first flown in 1946